The Fern Glen Formation is a geologic formation in eastern and southeastern Missouri. It preserves fossils dating back to the Osagean Series of the  Mississippian subperiod.

The Fern Glen is richly fossiliferous with abundant crinoids, corals, brachiopods and bryozoa.

See also

 List of fossiliferous stratigraphic units in Missouri
 Paleontology in Missouri

References

 

Mississippian Missouri
Carboniferous southern paleotropical deposits